The Strangest Man: The Hidden Life of Paul Dirac, Quantum Genius is a 2009 biography of quantum physicist Paul Dirac written by British physicist and author, Graham Farmelo, and published by Faber and Faber. The book won the Biography Award at the 2009 Costa Book Awards, and the 2009 Los Angeles Times Book Prize for Science and Technology.

The title is based on a comment by physicist Niels Bohr four years before his death that of all the scientists who had visited his institute, Dirac was "the strangest man".

Overview
Farmelo charts Dirac's life from his upbringing in early 20th-century Bristol, through his years in Cambridge, Göttingen and Princeton up until his death in 1984, and that of his wife 18 years later.

Throughout the book, Dirac's work and his unusual personality is explored, with his reservedness, apparent lack of empathy, and relentless literal-mindedness leading way to several humorous anecdotes. For example, when approached by two graduate students, while on a brief visit to Berkeley, Dirac sat through a brief presentation about their work on quantum field theory, bracing themselves for his perceptive comments, there was a long silence, after which Dirac asked them "Where is the post office?" Offering to take him there, the students suggested that he could give them his thoughts on their presentation, to which Dirac replied, "I can't do two things at once."

The book is divided into thirty-one chapters, each beginning with a short epigraph and covering a set time period, for example, chapter Twenty-one is entitled "January 1936-Summer 1939", and begins with a short quote by Paul Carus. The final two chapters break from the dating style, in order to discuss "Dirac's Brain and Persona" and his "Legacy". The book has a comprehensive set of notes, index, and six pages of black and white photographs.  In the final chapter, Farmelo presents arguments that Dirac may have been autistic and that this partially explains Dirac's well-known personality eccentricities.

The book was published in the United States under a slightly different title: The Strangest Man: The Hidden Life of Paul Dirac, Mystic of the Atom.

Reviews
Online literary magazine Bookhugger.co.uk labeled the book as "a moving human story, and a study of one of the most exciting times in scientific history." The magazine placed the book in their "Best of 2009" list as well. Playwright Michael Frayn, who wrote the play Copenhagen, remarked that "this was the biography Farmelo was born to write".

See also

American Prometheus: The Triumph and Tragedy of J. Robert Oppenheimer

References

External links
 Publisher's page

2009 non-fiction books
Faber and Faber books
Physics books
Books about scientists